The Matmor Formation is a geologic formation of up to  thick, that is exposed in Hamakhtesh Hagadol in southern Israel. The Matmor Formation contains fossils from a Jurassic equatorial shallow marine environment.  Bivalves, gastropods, sponges, corals, echinoderms, and sclerobionts are present in the Matmor Formation to various degrees (Wilson et al., 2010). The stratigraphy of the Matmor Formation consists of alternating layers of limestone and marl (Hirsch and Roded, 1996).

Stratigraphy 
The Iraq Petroleum Company originally described the Jurassic sequence in Hamakhtesh Hagadol of Israel in the 1930s (Hudson, 1958).  These findings were later described and published by Blake (1935).  Shaw (1947) published a limited summary of the stratigraphy. Hudson (1958) later subdivided the rocks into the Callovian, Divesian, Argovian, Sequanim biostratigraphic stages. In 1963, Goldberg subdivided the section into the Zohar, Kidod and Be'er Sheva Formations. Goldberg (1963) further divided the Zohar Formation into the Ziyya and Madsus members. In 1966, Mayac dated the Callovian and what appeared to be the Lower Oxfordian stages with forams (Mayac, 1966, in Hirsch and Roded, 1996). Further biostratigraphic work by Hirsch et al. (1998) and Grossowicz et al. (2000) show that the Matmor Formation is entirely Late Callovian.

Gallery

References

Further reading 
 Goldberg, M. (1963). "Reference section of Jurassic sequence in Hamakhtesh Hagadol (Kurnub Anticline).  Detailed binocular sample description, including field observations." Israel Geological Survey, Unpublished Report, pp. 1–50.
 Grossowicz, L.P., Bassoullet, J.P., Hirsch, F., & Peri, M. (2000). "Jurassic large Foraminifera from Israel." Geol. Surv. Isr. Current Res, 12, 132-144.
 Hirsch, F., Bassoullet, J. P., Cariou, E., Conway, B., Feldman, H., Grossowicz, L., Honigstein, A., Owen, E. and Rosenfeld, A. (1998). "The Jurassic of the southern Levant. Biostratigraphy, palaeogeography and cyclic events." In: S. Crasquin-Soleau and E. Barrier (eds.), Peri- Tethys Memoir 4: Epicratonic basins of the Peri- Tethyan platforms. Mem. Mus. natn. Hist. nat. 179: 213-235.
 
 
 

Geologic formations of Israel
Jurassic System of Asia
Callovian Stage
Limestone formations
Marl formations
Shallow marine deposits
Paleontology in Israel